Ammonium pertechnetate is a chemical compound with the formula NH4TcO4. It is the ammonium salt of pertechnetic acid. The most common form uses 99Tc. The compound is readily soluble in aqueous solutions forming ammonium and pertechnetate ions. 

It can be synthesized by the reaction of pertechnetic acid and ammonium nitrate:
HTcO4 + NH4NO3 → NH4TcO4 + HNO3

It thermally decomposes under inert atmosphere at 700 °C to technetium dioxide:

NH4TcO4 → TcO2 + 2 H2O + 1/2 N2

References

Pertechnetates